The 2014 Columbia Lions football team represented Columbia University in the 2014 NCAA Division I FCS football season. They were led by third year head coach Pete Mangurian and played their home games at Robert K. Kraft Field at Lawrence A. Wien Stadium. They were a member of the Ivy League. They finished the season 0–10, 0–7 in Ivy League play to finish in last place. This was the seventh time, and second consecutive year, the school ended the season winless. Columbia averaged 5,574 fans per game.

On December 5, 2014, amid allegations of mistreatment of players, head coach Pete Mangurian resigned. He had a three year record at Columbia of 3–27 and lost his last 21 games.

Schedule

References

Columbia
Columbia Lions football seasons
College football winless seasons
Columbia Lions football